This article aims at providing details on the participation and performance of Clube Desportivo Primeiro de Agosto at the various competitions organized by the Confederation of African Football, namely the CAF Champions League, the CAF Confederation Cup and the former CAF Cup and CAF Winner's Cup as well as international tournaments and friendlies.

Primeiro de Agosto has a total 24 participations in CAF-sponsored competitions, including 12 in the CAF Champions League, 5 in the African Cup of Champions Clubs, 3 in the CAF Cup Winners' Cup and 2 in both the CAF Confederation Cup and the CAF Cup.

In 1998, the club reached the final of the CAF Cup Winners' Cup, having finished as the runner-up. In 1997 and 2009, they reached the group stage of the CAF Champions League and of the CAF Confederation Cup, respectively.

In 2018, they reached the semi-finals of the champions league, where they were eliminated in a second-leg 4-2 defeat to Espérance Tunis, a match that included an alleged biased officiating performance by referee Janny Sikazwe.

Overall positions

2020–21 Champions League

2019–20 Champions League

2018–19 Champions League

2018 Champions League

Espérance vs D'Agosto
The heavily biased performance of Zambian referee Janny Sikazwe positively prevented D'Agosto from reaching the finals. The renowned referee had a disgraceful performance during the entire match, completely ignoring the rules of the game and clearly siding with the home team. The ice on the cake of his performance occurred shortly before Espérance's final goal, when D'Agosto scored but he inexplicably disallowed the goal on a would-be push to the Tunisian goal-keeper. In the aftermath, Sikazwe was suspended by CAF on suspicion of corruption.

2017 Champions League

2014 Champions League

2013 Champions League

2011 Confederation Cup

2010 Confederation Cup

2009 Confederation Cup

2009 Champions League

2008 Champions League

2007 Champions League

2003 CAF Cup

2000 Champions League

1999 Champions League

1998 Cup Winners' Cup
D'Agosto's coach Ndunguidi deployed three quarter-backs and that strategy paid off when Nsilulu made a superior play for Muanza to score 1-0. Espérance needed to play on the offense and three quarter-backs made D'Agosto's defense look like an insurmountable wall. Stopirrá, Pedro and Nsilulu were at the top of their game to the despair of their opponents. However, the home team managed to score at only 4 minutes of play. Espérance was putting a lot of pressure and close to half time, the referee wrongly awarded a penalty on Julião. Hamrouni took the penalty and scored 2-1. In the second half, D'Agosto was defending too close to the penalty box, Espérance took advantage and Laroussi scored 3-1 after a poor save by D'Agosto's goal-keeper Goliath.

The penalty missed by Assis in the second half at a time when D'Agosto was winning 1-0 might have been enough for D'Agosto to claim the title as they lost 3-1 in Tunis. That miss had a heavy toll on the future career of the young promising player. Assis was the team's official penalty taker. He had successfully scored two against USM so he had earned the trust of coach Ndunguidi Daniel. It was a nerve wracking, intense match. D'Agosto failed to display the superb gameplay they did against Africa Sport. Went for long kicks into the Tunisian penalty box instead of flanking using the speed of either Mendonça or Nsilulu. It was a huge responsibility. In the end, cries of sadness at Cidadela. If only that penalty had been scored...

Final

First Leg

Second Leg

1997 Champions League

1996 CAF Cup

1993 Cup of Champions Clubs

1992 Cup of Champions Clubs

1991 Cup Winners' Cup

1985 Cup Winners' Cup

1982 Cup of Champions Clubs

1981 Cup of Champions Clubs

1980 Cup of Champions Clubs

Friendlies
D'Agosto played a series of matches in preparation for that season's CAF club competitions whereas São Tomé was preparing for the qualification matches for the 2002 FIFA world cup. The matches were also played as a fund raiser for victims of floods in Mozambique.

On the occasion of the anniversary of Sporting de Benguela, Sporting de Portugal was invited to play a series of matches in Angola.

On the occasion of the 2nd Congress of the ruling party, the MPLA, Sporting da Praia from Cape Verde was invited to play a series of matches in Angola.

On the occasion of the 8th anniversary of the foundation of the Angolan Armed Forces, AS Bilima played a friendly match against D'Agosto in Cabinda

Primeiro De Agosto was invited to play two friendly matches in Mozambique on the occasion of the 6th anniversary of the Mozambican Armed Forces.

On April 4, 1981, before a 70.000 capacity crowd in Kaduna, Primeiro de Agosto played against then CAN title holders The Green Eagles. In that match that ended in a scoreless draw, D'Agosto put up such a superb performance that the Nigerian supporters and media mistook the club for the Angolan national team.

A four team tournament was organized to mark the 4th anniversary of the club's foundation. In the first match, D'Agosto was kindly awarded victory as the match ended in a draw and a power outage prevented the match to be decided on penalty shootouts.

In June 1980, Primeiro de Agosto's reserve team competed in a four-team tournament in Mozambique with the participation of Desportivo de Maputo and D'Agosto's counterparts (military-sponsored teams) from the home country and Zambia, respectively Matchedje and the Green Buffaloes.

In December 1979, Sparta Prague - a friendly army club - was invited to play a football match in Luanda.

External links
 Referees

References

C.D. Primeiro de Agosto
Angolan football clubs in international competitions